Athletic Club Cambrésien is a French association football team founded in 1919. They are based in Cambrai, France and play in the Division d'Honneur Nord Pas de Calais in the French football league system. They play at the Stade de la Liberté in Cambrai.

Honours 
 Runner-up of Amateur French Championship: 1966
 Champion of Division d'Honneur Nord : 1964, 1984

Current squad

References 

Football clubs in France
Association football clubs established in 1919
1919 establishments in France
AC Cambrai
Sport in Nord (French department)
Football clubs in Hauts-de-France